"Still Po Pimpin" is the lead single from Do or Die's second album, Headz or Tailz.

A "sequel" to the group's highly successful 1996 hit "Po Pimp" and like "Po Pimp", "Still Po Pimpin" was produced by The Legendary Traxster and featured a guest verse from Twista and a chorus from Johnny P. The song became a minor hit, peaking at No. 62 on the Billboard Hot 100, as well as reaching both the R&B and rap charts and to date is the group's final single to reach any of the three charts. The song also appeared on the group's 2003 compilation Greatest Hits.

Single track listing

A-Side
"Still Pimpin'" (Full Mix)    
"Still Pimpin'" (Clean Mix)

B-Side
"Still Pimpin'" (Mike Dean Remix)    
"Still Pimpin'" (Instrumental)

Charts

1998 singles
Do or Die (group) songs
Twista songs